Convoy SC 107 was the 107th of the numbered series of World War II Slow Convoys of merchant ships from Sydney, Cape Breton Island to Liverpool. The ships departed New York City on 24 October 1942 and were found and engaged by a wolfpack of U-boats which sank fifteen ships. It was the heaviest loss of ships from any trans-Atlantic convoy through the winter of 1942–43.  The attack included one of the largest non-nuclear man-made explosions in history, when  torpedoed ammunition ships SS Hobbema and SS Hatimura - both were sunk, one exploded, with the German submarine also being destroyed in the explosion.

Background
As western Atlantic coastal convoys brought an end to the "Second Happy Time", Admiral Karl Dönitz, the Befehlshaber der U-Boote (BdU) or commander in chief of U-Boats, shifted focus to the mid-Atlantic to avoid aircraft patrols. Although convoy routing was less predictable in the mid-ocean, Dönitz anticipated that the increased numbers of U-boats being produced would be able to effectively search for convoys with the advantage of intelligence gained through B-Dienst decryption of British Naval Cypher Number 3. However, only 20 percent of the 180 trans-Atlantic convoys sailing from the end of July 1942 until the end of April 1943 lost ships to U-boat attack.

Discovery
B-Dienst decrypted message traffic detailing routing and composition of convoy SC 107, and fifteen U-boats of wolfpack Veilchen (violet) were deployed to intercept it. Soon after, a No. 10 Squadron RCAF Digby bomber sunk , patrolling in the area of the convoy. As the boats of Veilchen were sailing towards their assembly point, wolfpack boat  was sunk by a RCAF Lockheed Hudson. Wolfpack boat  found the convoy and released U-522 to sail off for other prey.

First attack on 1/2 November
Stockport and Restigouche located 25 HF/DF transmissions from the eight U-boats in contact with the convoy on the afternoon of 1 November, but the single destroyer was unable to investigate all of them. At sunset  HMS Celandine was sent to investigate the closest HF/DF fix eight miles off the port quarter; and Restigouche made a sweep astern. After sunset, a clearing sky revealed the flickering aurora borealis to port silhouetting the convoy and its three remaining escorts. As Restgouche engaged an ASDIC contact six miles behind the convoy with depth charges and star shells, nervous merchant sailors revealed the convoy location by firing snowflake pyrotechnic mortars.

While Restigouche pursued another U-boat, Kapitänleutnant Siegfried von Forstner's  passed the destroyer at 22:40 while overtaking the silhouetted convoy from astern. When corvette  had a radar malfunction, U-402 went undetected as it penetrated the starboard side on the convoy screen about midnight to torpedo the British freighter Empire Sunrise. Empire Sunrise fired two flares and most of the ships in convoy fired snowflake mortars. U-402 dived to avoid the rapidly approaching Restigouche whose depth charges were comfortably distant.

While Celandine dropped astern to screen Stockport rescuing survivors from Empire Sunrise, U-402 twice more penetrated the convoy screen where Celadine had been and torpedoed the Greek freighter Rinos and British freighters Dalcroy, and Empire Leopard. U-402 was lightly damaged by machine-gun fire from corvette  and by a  projectile from a merchant ship. Kapitänleutnant von Forstner would receive the Knight's Cross of the Iron Cross for his work in U-402 during this convoy and in Convoy SC 118 on the next patrol. U-522 torpedoed the Greek freighter Mount Pelion and British freighters Hartington and Maratima.

2 November
Rain and misty weather caused the U-boats to lose contact after U-522 torpedoed Greek freighter Parthenon in a daylight attack. Escort Group C-4 was reinforced by the V-class destroyer  from convoy HX 213 before nine U-boats regained contact when visibility improved on 3 November.

Second attack on 3/4 November
Celandine, Amherst and Vanessa attacked the gathering U-boats unsuccessfully while the convoy reassembled after losing cohesion in the fog. One of the straggling merchant ships avoided two torpedoes launched by U-438. U-521 torpedoed the American tanker Hahira shortly after dawn on 3 November. Stockport was carrying 350 survivors by the time she picked up those from Hahira. Harbor tugs  and  had been attached to the convoy for passage to Iceland, and were detailed to act as rescue ships because Stockport was carrying three times her intended capacity. The little tugs were ordered to keep their running lights on in their assigned rescue positions astern of the convoy to minimize chances they might be mistaken for U-boats.  torpedoed the convoy commodore's freighter Jeypore after sunset on 3 November; but snowflake illumination was minimal because most ships had exhausted their supply of pyrotechnics during the earlier attacks. Corvettes  and  made unsuccessful counterattacks before  torpedoed the Dutch freighter SS Hobbema and British freighters Empire Lynx and Hatimura at 23:10. The entire convoy and nearby U-boats were shaken thirty minutes later by a heavy explosion believed to have been one of the largest prior to atomic bomb testing. The magnitude of the explosion temporarily stopped the engine of the rescue tug six miles astern of the convoy and caused several ships to believe they had been torpedoed. Titus was abandoned before the captain realized she was undamaged and returned with a skeleton crew including survivors from other ships. U-boats submerged at a depth of 200 feet reported being severely jolted, and U-132 is believed to have been destroyed by the detonation. The cause of the explosion was undetermined, but assumed to have resulted from detonation of the ammunition cargo of either Hobbema or Hatimura while they were sinking.

On 4 November, Arvida and Celandine were detached to Iceland with Stockport and the two tugs overcrowded with a total of 590 survivors. No. 120 Squadron RAF B-24 Liberators scrambled from Iceland drove off the remaining U-boats, and the convoy reached Liverpool on 10 November.

Ships in convoy

German losses
RCAF bombers, patrolling the area of Convoy SC 107, sunk the free-patrolling  on 30 October and wolfpack Veilchen member  on 5 November.  Wolfpack Veilchen boat  sunk herself through the explosion caused by her torpedoing of Hobbema (or Hatimura) on 4 November.

See also
 Convoy Battles of World War II
 Operation CHASE for a description of experimental detonation of obsolete munition cargoes in sinking ships to simulate nuclear testing.

Notes

References

 
 
 
 
 

SC107
Naval battles of World War II involving Canada
C